"B.M.F. (Blowin' Money Fast)" is the second single from Rick Ross' fourth studio album Teflon Don. It features Styles P. It was produced by Lex Luger. The song was originally released as an unmastered version on Ross' promotional mixtape, the Albert Anastasia EP. The song was named as MTV News' #4 Song Of 2010.

Remixes
Spose, Papoose, Yo Gotti, Haystak, Jelly Roll, Brabo Gator, French Montana, Hot Dollar, Skepta, Lil' Flip, Yelawolf, Jermaine Dupri, Tyga, Frenchie (rapper) and Bun B have recorded their own remixes to the song. Lupe Fiasco remixed the song under the name Building Minds Faster. Spose recorded a remix for his successful collaborative mixtape titled We Smoked It All Vol. II with label mate Cam Groves. Young Jeezy made a remix for the song titled Death B4 Dishonor on his mixtape 1,000 Grams which was originally thought to be a Rick Ross diss, but was later revealed by Young Jeezy that it was a misunderstanding. Ross replied to Young Jeezy's Death Before Dishonor on August 12, 2010, called "The Summa's Mine". Trademark da Skydiver & Curren$y also made a remix to this song, entitled "J.E.T.S.". Slovak rapper Rytmus also has recorded his own version titled "BMF (Best rapper in Europe)" supported by video.

Music video
The music video premiered on July 13, 2010, and was directed by Parris.  It was premiered on BET's 106 & Park on August 2, 2010. Diddy, Bun B, DJ Envy, Jadakiss, Triple C's, Gunplay, Sheek Louch, DJ Khaled, DJ Clue, Young Jeezy, Trick Daddy, Plies, Fabolous, Fat Joe, Shawty Lo, Cassie and Lex Luger, the song's producer, appear in the music video.

Cultural references
The title itself, "BMF", is a reference to the gang Black Mafia Family. Ross then shouts out the gang's founder Big Meech when he raps the line, "I think I'm Big Meech". In the following line, he references Larry Hoover, former leader of the Black Gangster Disciple Nation.

Demetrius "Big Meech" Flenory himself has stated that he is a fan of the record.

Styles P also made a reference to the video game, Red Dead Redemption.

Ross also uses "Archie Bunker" as a synonym for Cocaine. Archie Bunker was a white character in All In The Family who frequently made prejudiced or racist remarks.

The song was covered on the second part of the History of Rap skit by Jimmy Fallon and Justin Timberlake on the Jimmy Fallon Show.

Charts
"B.M.F" debuted at No. 60 on the Billboard Hot 100.

Weekly charts

Year-end charts

Certifications

References

2010 singles
Rick Ross songs
Styles P songs
Song recordings produced by Lex Luger (musician)
Songs written by Rick Ross
Maybach Music Group singles
Songs written by Lex Luger (musician)
2010 songs
Trap music songs